Hasanabad (also Romanized as Ḩasanābād) is a village in Chaf Rural District, in the Central District of Langarud County, Gilan Province, Iran. At the 2006 census, its population was 66, in 25 families.

References 

Populated places in Langarud County